The 2015 Chattanooga Mocs football team represented the University of Tennessee at Chattanooga in the 2015 NCAA Division I FCS football season as a member of the Southern Conference (SoCon). The Mocs were led by seventh-year head coach Russ Huesman and played their home games at Finley Stadium in Chattanooga, Tennessee. They finished the season 9–4 overall and 6–1 in SoCon play to share for the SoCon title with The Citadel. Chattanooga earned the SoCon's automatic bid to the NCAA Division I Football Championship playoffs, where they defeated Fordham in the first round before losing in the second round to Jacksonville State.

Schedule

Game summaries

Jacksonville State

Mars Hill

at Samford

at Presbyterian

Furman

at VMI

at Wofford

Western Carolina

at Mercer

The Citadel

at Florida State

FCS playoffs

First Round–Fordham

Second Round–at Jacksonville State

Ranking movements

References

Chattanooga
Chattanooga Mocs football seasons
Southern Conference football champion seasons
Chattanooga
Chattanooga Mocs football